Batadombalena is an archaeological site with evidence of habitation from 8,000 years BCE, Balangoda Man, located  from Colombo in Sri Lanka, a two-hour drive from Colombo.

The Batadombalena archaeological site contains evidence of habitation from as early as 8,000 years BCE and is one of the sites whose discoveries support the "Out of Africa" hypothesis, according to Professor Paul Mellars, a Cambridge University archaeologist. Among the evidence of Balangoda Man he unearthed at the site were stone tools that are interpreted as arrow - or spearheads and carefully shaped and perforated beads made from ostrich eggshell fragments. One particular piece of an ostrich eggshell, incised with a distinctive criss-cross motif, has also been discovered.

See also
 Batatotalena Cave
 Balangoda Man
 Fa Hien cave

References

 Kenneth A. R. Kennedy, "Fa Hien Cave", in Encyclopedia of Anthropology ed. H. James Birx (2006, SAGE Publications)
 "Pre- and Protohistoric settlement in Sri Lanka" — S. U. Deraniyagala, Director-General of Archaeology, Sri Lanka
 Kenneth A. R. Kennedy and Siran U. Deraniyagala, Fossil remains of 28,000-year old hominids from Sri Lanka, Current Anthropology, Vol. 30, No. 3. (Jun., 1989), pp. 394–399.
 Kenneth A. R. Kennedy, T. Disotell, W. J. Roertgen, J. Chiment and J. Sherry, Biological anthropology of upper Pleistocene hominids from Sri Lanka: Batadomba Lena and Beli Lena caves, Ancient Ceylon 6: 165-265.
 Kenneth A. R. Kennedy, Siran U. Deraniyagala, W. J. Roertgen, J. Chiment and T. Disotell, Upper Pleistocene fossil hominids from Sri Lanka, American Journal of Physical Anthropology, 72: 441-461, 1987.
 Dr. Deraniyagala
 Annual Review of Anthropology: 1980 By Bernard J. Siegel - Page 403 & 416
 [1] Propaedia: outline of knowledge and guide to the Britannica.--[2]-[11] Micropaedia: ready reference and index.--[12]-[30] Macropaedia: knowledge in depth.
 Professor Paul Mellars

External links
 Pre- and protohistoric settlement in Sri Lanka
 Prehistoric basis for the rise of civilisation in Sri Lanka and southern India
 Here they lived and died

Prehistoric Sri Lanka
Archaeological sites in Sri Lanka
Caves of Sri Lanka